The 2001 World Jiu-Jitsu Championship was held at Tijuca Tênis Clube, Rio de Janeiro, Brazil.

Teams results 
Results by Academy

External links 
 World Jiu-Jitsu Championship

References 

World Jiu-Jitsu Championship